Long Island is a densely populated island in the southeastern region of the U.S. state of New York, part of the New York metropolitan area. With over 8 million people, Long Island is the most populous island in the United States and the 18th-most populous in the world.

The island comprises four counties: Kings and Queens counties (the New York City boroughs of Brooklyn and Queens, respectively) and Nassau County share the western third of the island, while Suffolk County occupies the eastern two-thirds of the island. More than half of New York City's residents (58.4%) lived on Long Island as of 2020, in Brooklyn and in Queens. Locally, many people in the New York metropolitan area colloquially use the term "Long Island" (or "the Island") to refer exclusively to Nassau and Suffolk counties, and conversely, employ the term "the City" to mean Manhattan alone. The Nassau-and-Suffolk-only definition of Long Island is recognized as a "region" by the state of New York. Although geographically an island, the Supreme Court of the United States has held that given the island's extensive ties to the mainland, it should be treated like a peninsula, allowing the state to have jurisdiction within its extensive maritime boundaries.

Long Island may refer both to the main island and the surrounding outer barrier islands. To its west, Long Island is separated from Manhattan and the Bronx by the East River tidal estuary. North of the island is Long Island Sound, across which lie Westchester County, New York, and the state of Connecticut. Across the Block Island Sound to the northeast is the state of Rhode Island. Block Island—which is part of Rhode Island—and numerous smaller islands extend further into the Atlantic. To the extreme southwest, Long Island, at Brooklyn, is separated from Staten Island and the state of New Jersey by Upper New York Bay, the Narrows, and Lower New York Bay.

With a population of 8,063,232 residents as of the 2020 U.S. Census, constituting 40% of the State of New York's population, Long Island is the most populated island in any U.S. state or territory, the third-most populous island in the Americas (after only Hispaniola and Cuba), and the 18th-most populous island in the world (ahead of Ireland, Jamaica, and Hokkaidō). If Long Island geographically constituted an independent metropolitan statistical area, it would rank fourth most populous in the United States; if it were a U.S. state, Long Island would rank thirteenth in population and first in population density. Long Island is culturally and ethnically diverse, featuring some of the wealthiest and most expensive neighborhoods in the world near the shorelines, as well as working-class areas in all four counties.

As of 2020, Long Island had a gross domestic product of over US$200 billion. Median household income on the island significantly exceeds $100,000, and the median home price is approximately $600,000. Among residents over the age of 25, 42.6% hold a college degree or higher educationally. Unemployment on Long Island stays consistently below 4%. 

As a hub of commercial aviation, Long Island is home to two of the nation's and New York City metropolitan area's three busiest airports, JFK International Airport and LaGuardia Airport, in addition to Long Island MacArthur Airport; as well as two major air traffic control radar facilities, the New York TRACON and the New York ARTCC. Nine bridges and thirteen navigable tunnels (road and railroad tunnels but not metropolitan water tunnels) connect Brooklyn and Queens to the three other boroughs of New York City. Ferries connect Suffolk County northward across Long Island Sound to Connecticut. The Long Island Rail Road is the busiest commuter railroad in North America and operates continuously. Biotechnology companies, engineering, and scientific research play a significant role in Long Island's economy, including research facilities at Brookhaven National Laboratory, Cold Spring Harbor Laboratory, Stony Brook University, New York Institute of Technology, Plum Island Animal Disease Center, the New York University Tandon School of Engineering, the Hofstra Northwell School of Medicine, and the Feinstein Institutes for Medical Research.

History

Early history

By the year 1643, there were 14 indigenous nations living on Long Island: the Canarsee, Rockaway, Metoac, Merrick, Massapequa, Nissequoge, Secatoag, Seatauket, Patchoag, Unquechogue, has Corchaug, Shinnecock, Manhasset, and Montaukett.

The first nations of Long Island used canoes as a source of transportation, and since they lived by the shores, they went fishing. The fishermen used bows, arrows, and hooks to catch seafood such as crabs, scallops, and lobster.  The farmers used fish for fertilizer and planted vegetables such as corn, beans, and squash, which were popular among the indigenous people. They were exceptional farmers; they had a great understanding of how the weather and soil affected the crops. Many of them hunted animals, such as deer, raccoon, and turkey in the forest.

The government that they set up was a participatory democracy and there was an alliance between the nations. Each nation had its own territory and chief that was respected by other tribes. Prior to European colonization, the Lenape people (named the Delaware by Europeans) inhabited the western end of Long Island and spoke the Munsee dialect of Lenape, part of the Algonquian language family. The Lenape (who were part of the Shinnecock Tribe) practiced record keeping and used wooden tablets, trees, and stones to keep record. They also used wampum belts to write down important messages. They also used their wampum to trade with the Europeans. The Lenape people, in specific, were seen as peacemakers by other indigenous nations, although they would defend themselves if necessary. The Europeans admired their friendliness and their skills in mediation. ref

Giovanni da Verrazzano was the first European to record an encounter with the Lenapes, after entering what is now New York Bay in 1524. The island's eastern portion was inhabited by speakers of the Mohegan-Pequot language group of Algonquian languages; they were part of the Pequot and Narragansett peoples inhabiting the area that now includes Connecticut and Rhode Island.

In 1609, the English navigator Henry Hudson explored the harbor and purportedly landed at the present-day Coney Island. Dutch explorer Adriaen Block followed in 1615 and is credited as the first European to determine that both Manhattan and Long Island are islands.

In 1636, Charles I of England, a Stuart, rewarded Scottish courtier, diplomat, and colonial governor William Alexander's service to the Crown by creating him Lord Alexander of Tullibody and Viscount of Stirling. On April 22 of that year Charles told the Plymouth Colony, which had laid claim to Long Island but had not settled it, to cede it to Alexander.  When his agent James Farret arrived in New Amsterdam in 1637 to present his claim of English sovereignty he was arrested and sent to prison in Holland (but escaped).

In 1639, Lion Gardiner purchased an islet off of today's East Hampton, Gardiners Island, from the Montaukett, received Farret's approval of the transaction on behalf of Alexander (by then the 1st Earl of Stirling and Viscount Canada), and subsequently received a royal patent establishing him as Lord of the Manor over it.

In 1640, English colonists attempted to settle at Cow Bay at what today is Port Washington. After an alert by Native leader Penhawitz, the colonists were arrested by the Dutch but released after saying they were mistaken about the title.

Through Farret (who personally received Shelter Island and Robins Island), Alexander in turn sold most of the eastern island to the New Haven Colony and Connecticut Colony.

In spite of these shifting claims to title and absentee land sales, European settlers continued to purchase land directly from the Indigenous people. In 1655 they split the acquired land amongst themselves and continued to search the island for more land for settlement. Other parts of indigenous land were bought, areas that are now known as Brookhaven, Bellport, and South haven. These purchases occurred on June 10, 1664, the exchange was four coats and what is now $16.25.

The white settlers and the indigenous people lived amicably together for a while. During King Philip's War in 1675, the English governor of New York ordered all canoes that were east of Hell Gate to be confiscated. This was done to prevent the Indigenous people from helping their native allies on the mainland, who were attacking settlers there.

After the Dutch began to move into Manhattan many of the indigenous people moved to Pennsylvania and Delaware. Many of them who stayed behind died from smallpox as North Americans had never been exposed to the disease before, resulting in large scale deaths due to lack of antibodies and natural resistance which Eurasian peoples gained.

The name "'t Lange Eylandt alias Matouwacs" appears in Dutch maps from the 1650s. Later, the English referred to the land as "Nassau Island", after the Dutch Prince William of Nassau, Prince of Orange (who later also ruled as King William III of England). It is unclear when the name "Nassau Island" was discontinued. Another indigenous name from colonial time, Paumanok, comes from the Native American name for Long Island and means "the island that pays tribute."

The very first European settlements on Long Island were by settlers from England and its colonies in present-day New England. Lion Gardiner settled nearby Gardiners Island. The first settlement on the geographic Long Island itself was on October 21, 1640, when Southold was established by the Rev. John Youngs and settlers from New Haven, Connecticut. Peter Hallock, one of the settlers, drew the long straw and was granted the honor to step ashore first. He is considered the first New World settler on Long Island. Southampton was settled in the same year. Hempstead followed in 1644, East Hampton in 1648, Huntington in 1653, Brookhaven in 1655, and Smithtown in 1665.

While the eastern region of Long Island was first settled by the English, the western portion of Long Island was settled by the Dutch; until 1664, the jurisdiction of Long Island was split between the Dutch and English, roughly at the present border between Nassau County and Suffolk County. The Dutch founded six towns in present-day Brooklyn beginning in 1645. These included: Brooklyn, Gravesend, Flatlands, Flatbush, New Utrecht, and Bushwick. The Dutch had granted an English settlement in Hempstead, New York (now in Nassau County) in 1644, but after a boundary dispute they drove out English settlers from the Oyster Bay area. However, in 1664, the English returned to take over the Dutch colony of New Netherland, including Long Island.

The 1664 land patent granted to the Duke of York included all islands in Long Island Sound. The Duke of York held a grudge against Connecticut, as New Haven had hidden three of the judges (John Dixwell, Edward Whalley and William Goffe) who sentenced the Duke's father, King Charles I, to death in 1649. Settlers throughout Suffolk County pressed to stay part of Connecticut, but Governor Sir Edmund Andros threatened to eliminate the settlers' rights to land if they did not yield, which they did by 1676.

All of Long Island (as well as the islands between it and Connecticut) became part of the Province of New York within the Shire of York. Present-day Suffolk County was designated as the East Riding (of Yorkshire), present-day Brooklyn was part of the West Riding, and present-day Queens and Nassau were part of the larger North Riding. In 1683, Yorkshire was dissolved and the three original counties on Long Island were established: Kings, Queens, and Suffolk.

18th and 19th centuries

William Floyd was born on Long Island on December 17, 1734. His family had emigrated to America in 1654 and by the time of his birth were well established and wealthy. He was a member of the Suffolk County Militia in the early conflict with Britain, attaining the rank of Major General. In 1774 he was chosen as a representative from New York to the First Continental Congress. His property was destroyed by British and Tory sympathizers. In 1789 he was elected to the United States House of Representatives, serving until 1791. Francis Lewis from Brookhaven on Long Island was another signer of the Declaration that also had his home destroyed by the British, who then imprisoned his wife. George Washington managed her release by having the wives of two wealthy Philadelphia Tories arrested, then exchanging them for Mrs. Lewis.

Marinus Willett of Jamaica, Queens enlisted in the colonial militia after the French and Indian War broke out in 1754. He participated in the Ticonderoga campaign and the capture of Fort Frontenac in 1758. Joining the revolutionary Sons of Liberty in the 1770s, Willett shortly thereafter enlisted in the Continental Army in 1775. Serving in the 1st New York, he took part in the Invasion of Quebec before transferring to the 3rd New York in 1776. Seeing action at Monmouth, Willett then participated in the 1778 Sullivan Campaign. He was made the colonel of the 5th New York in 1780 and the Tryon County militia in 1781, where he fought at Johnstown. On August 22, 1830, Willett died and was buried in the graveyard of Trinity Church. The Willets Point and the accompanying Mets-Willets Point station is named in his honor.

Early in the American Revolutionary War, the island was captured by the British from General George Washington in the Battle of Long Island, a decisive battle after which Washington narrowly evacuated his troops from Brooklyn Heights under a dense fog. After the British victory on Long Island, many Patriots withdrew, leaving mostly Loyalists behind. The island was a British stronghold until the end of the war in 1783.

General Washington based his espionage activities on Long Island, due to the western part of the island's proximity to the British military headquarters in New York City. The Culper Spy Ring included agents operating between Setauket and Manhattan. This ring alerted Washington to valuable British secrets, including the treason of Benedict Arnold and a plan to use counterfeiting to induce economic sabotage.

Long Island's colonists served both Loyalist and Patriot causes, with many prominent families divided among both sides. During the occupation British troops used a number of civilian structures for defense and demanded to be quartered in the homes of civilians. A number of structures from this era remain. Among these are Raynham Hall, the Oyster Bay home of patriot spy Robert Townsend, and the Caroline Church in Setauket, which contains bullet holes from a skirmish known as the Battle of Setauket. Also in existence is a reconstruction of Brooklyn's Old Stone House, on the site of the Maryland 400's celebrated last stand during the Battle of Long Island.

In the 19th century, Long Island was still mainly rural and devoted to agriculture. The predecessor to the Long Island Rail Road (LIRR) began service in 1836 from the South Ferry in Brooklyn, through the remainder of Brooklyn, to Jamaica in Queens. The line was completed to the east end of Long Island in 1844 (as part of a plan for transportation to Boston). Competing railroads (soon absorbed by the LIRR) were built along the south shore to accommodate travellers from those more populated areas. For the century from 1830 until 1930, total population roughly doubled every twenty years, with more dense development in areas near Manhattan. Several cities were incorporated, such as the "City of Brooklyn" in Kings County, and Long Island City in Queens.

Until the 1883 completion of the Brooklyn Bridge, the only means of travel between Long Island and the rest of the United States was by boat or ship. As other bridges and tunnels were constructed, areas of the island began to be developed as residential suburbs, first around the railroads that offered commuting into the city. On January 1, 1898, Kings County and portions of Queens County were consolidated into the "City of Greater New York", abolishing all cities and towns within them. The easternmost  of Queens County, which were not part of the consolidation plan,
separated from Queens in 1899 to form Nassau County.

At the close of the 19th century, wealthy industrialists who made vast fortunes during the Gilded Age began to construct large "baronial" country estates in Nassau County communities along the North Shore of Long Island, favoring the many properties with water views. Proximity to Manhattan attracted such men as J. P. Morgan, William K. Vanderbilt, and Charles Pratt, whose estates led to this area being nicknamed the Gold Coast. This period and the area was immortalized in fiction, such as F. Scott Fitzgerald's The Great Gatsby, which has also been adapted in films.

20th century

Charles Lindbergh lifted off from Roosevelt Field with his Spirit of Saint Louis for his historic 1927 solo flight to Europe, one of the events that helped to establish Long Island as an early center of aviation during the 20th century. Other famous aviators such as Wiley Post originated notable flights from Floyd Bennett Field in Brooklyn, which became the first major airport serving New York City before it was superseded by the opening of La Guardia Airport in 1939. Long Island was also the site of Mitchel Air Force Base and was a major center of military aircraft production by companies such as Grumman and Fairchild Aircraft during World War II and for some decades afterward. Aircraft production on Long Island extended all the way into the Space Age – Grumman was one of the major contractors that helped to build the early lunar flight and space shuttle vehicles. Although the aircraft companies eventually ended their Long Island operations and the early airports were all later closed – Roosevelt Field, for instance, became the site of a major shopping mall – the Cradle of Aviation Museum on the site of the former Mitchel Field documents the Island's key role in the history of aviation.

From the 1920s to the 1940s, Long Island began the transformation from backwoods and farms as developers created numerous suburbs. Numerous branches of the Long Island Rail Road (LIRR) already enabled commuting from the suburbs to Manhattan. Robert Moses engineered various automobile parkway projects to span the island, and developed beaches and state parks for the enjoyment of residents and visitors from the city. Gradually, development also followed these parkways, with various communities springing up along the more traveled routes.

After World War II, suburban development increased with incentives under the G.I. Bill, and Long Island's population skyrocketed, mostly in Nassau County and western Suffolk County. Second and third-generation children of immigrants moved out to eastern Long Island to settle in new housing developments built during the post-war boom. Levittown became noted as a suburb, where housing construction was simplified to be produced on a large scale. These provided opportunities for white World War II military veterans returning home to buy houses and start a family. In his 1966 book, My Private America (Moja prywatna Ameryka), Kazimierz Wierzyński, a Polish poet who could not go back to Poland after World War II, describes Polish farmers living there, as "walking novels".

21st century
By the start of the 21st century, a number of Long Island communities had converted their assets from industrial uses to post-industrial roles. Brooklyn reversed decades of population decline and factory closings to resurface as a globally renowned cultural and intellectual hotbed. Gentrification has affected much of Brooklyn and a portion of Queens, relocating a sizeable swath of New York City's population. On eastern Long Island, such villages as Port Jefferson, Patchogue, and Riverhead have been changed from inactive shipbuilding and mill towns into tourist-centric commercial centers with cultural attractions.

The descendants of late 19th and early 20th-century immigrants from southern and eastern Europe, and Black migrants from the South, have been followed by more recent immigrants from Asia and Latin America. Long Island has many ethnic Irish, Jews, and Italians, as well as an increasing numbers of Asians and Hispanics, reflecting later migrations.

Geography

 

The westernmost end of Long Island contains the New York City boroughs of Brooklyn (Kings County) and Queens (Queens County). The central and eastern portions contain the suburban Nassau and Suffolk counties. However, colloquial usage of the term "Long Island" usually refers only to Nassau and Suffolk counties. For example, the Federal Reserve Bank of New York has a district named "Long Island (Nassau-Suffolk Metro Division)." At least as late as 1911, locations in Queens were still commonly referred to as being on Long Island. Some institutions in the New York City section of the island use the island's names, like Long Island University and Long Island Jewish Medical Center.

In 1985, the U.S. Supreme Court ruled in United States v. Maine that Long Island is integrally related to the mainland enough that Long Island Sound and the western part of Block Island Sound constitute a "juridical bay" for the purpose of determining maritime state boundaries.  In the popular media this has been often misinterpreted as a ruling that Long Island is legally not an island.  The United States Board on Geographic Names still considers Long Island an island, because it is surrounded by water.

There are few tall buildings on Long Island.  Nassau County is more densely developed than Suffolk County. While affluent overall, Nassau County has pockets of more pronounced wealth with estates covering greater acreage within the Gold Coast of the North Shore and the Five Towns area on the South Shore. South Shore communities are built along protected wetlands of the island and contain white sandy beaches of Outer Barrier Islands fronting on the Atlantic Ocean. Dutch and English settlers from the time before the American Revolutionary War, as well as communities of Native Americans, populated the island. The 19th century saw the infusion of the wealthiest Americans in the so-called Gold Coast of the North Shore, where wealthy Americans and Europeans in the Gilded Age built lavish country homes.

In its easternmost sections, Suffolk County remains semi-rural, as in Greenport on the North Fork and some of the periphery of the area prominently known as The Hamptons, although summer tourism swells the population in those areas. The North Fork peninsula of Suffolk County's East End has developed a burgeoning wine region. In addition, the South Fork peninsula is known for beach communities, including the Hamptons, and for the Montauk Point Lighthouse at the eastern tip of the island. The Pine Barrens is a preserved pine forest encompassing much of eastern Suffolk County.

Geology
A detailed geomorphological study of Long Island provides evidence of glacial history of the kame and terminal moraines of the island which were formed by the advance and retreat of two ice sheets. Long Island, as part of the Outer Lands region, is formed largely of two spines of glacial moraine, with a large, sandy outwash plain beyond. These moraines consist of gravel and loose rock left behind during the two most recent pulses of Wisconsin glaciation during the ice ages some 21,000 years ago (19,000 BC). The northern moraine, which directly abuts the North Shore of Long Island at points, is known as the Harbor Hill moraine. The more southerly moraine, known as the Ronkonkoma moraine, forms the "backbone" of Long Island; it runs primarily through the very center of Long Island, roughly coinciding with the length of the Long Island Expressway.

The land to the south of this moraine to the South Shore is the outwash plain of the last glacier. One part of the outwash plain was known as the Hempstead Plains, and this land contained one of the few natural prairies to exist east of the Appalachian Mountains. The glaciers melted and receded to the north, resulting in the difference between the topography of the North Shore beaches and the South Shore beaches. The North Shore beaches are rocky from the remaining glacial debris, while the South Shore's are crisp, clear, outwash sand. The glaciers also formed Lake Ronkonkoma in Suffolk County and Lake Success in Nassau County, each a deep kettle lake.

Countyscapes

Climate

Under the Köppen climate classification, Long Island lies in a transition zone between a humid subtropical climate (Cfa) and a hot-summer humid continental climate (Dfa). The climate features hot, usually humid summers with occasional thunderstorms, mild spring and fall weather, and cold winters with a mix of snow and rain and stormier conditions. Spring can be cool due to the relatively cooler temperatures of the Atlantic Ocean and occasional blocking. Thunderstorms rarely form directly over Long Island, but can form over inland areas and then move eastward. Some storms may weaken as they approach Long Island due to the moderating effects of the Atlantic Ocean. The ocean also brings afternoon sea breezes to the immediate South Shore areas (within ) that temper the heat in the warmer months. The temperatures south of Sunrise Highway (NY Route 27) tend to be significantly cooler than the rest of Long Island in the spring and summer months because of the relatively cooler temperatures of the Atlantic Ocean. Long Island has a moderately sunny climate, averaging 2,400 to 2,800 hours of sunshine annually.

Due to its coastal location, Long Island winter temperatures are milder than most of the state. Temperatures seldom fall below  or rise above . Long Island temperatures vary from west to east, with the western part (Nassau County, Queens, and Brooklyn) generally 2 to 3 degrees F (1 to 2 degrees C) warmer than the east (Suffolk County). This is due to several factors: the western part is closer to the mainland and more densely developed, causing the "urban heat island" effect, and Long Island's land mass veers northward as one travels east. Also, daytime high temperatures on the eastern part of Long Island are cooler on most occasions, due to the moderating effect of the Atlantic Ocean and Long Island Sound. On dry nights with no clouds or wind, the Central Part of Suffolk County and Pine Barrens forest of eastern Suffolk County can be almost 5 to 10 F (3 to 5 C) cooler than the rest of the island, due to radiational cooling. Average dew points, a measure of atmospheric moisture, typically lie in the  range during July and August.

On August 13, 2014, flash flooding occurred in western-central Suffolk County after a record-setting rainfall deposited more than three months' worth of precipitation on the area within a few hours.

Long Island is somewhat vulnerable to tropical cyclones. While it lies north of where most tropical cyclones turn eastward and out to sea (most landfalls on the East Coast of the U.S. occur from North Carolina southward), several tropical cyclones have struck Long Island, including a devastating Category 3, the 1938 New England hurricane (also known as the "Long Island Express"), and another Category 3, Hurricane Carol in 1954. Other 20th-century storms that made landfall on Long Island at hurricane intensity include the 1944 Great Atlantic hurricane, Hurricane Donna in 1960, Hurricane Belle in 1976, and Hurricane Gloria in 1985. Also, the eyewall of Hurricane Bob in 1991 brushed the eastern tip. In August 2011, portions of Long Island were evacuated in preparation for Hurricane Irene, a Category 1 hurricane which weakened to a tropical storm before it reached Long Island.

On October 29, 2012, Hurricane Sandy caused extensive damage to low-lying coastal areas of Nassau and Suffolk counties, Brooklyn, and Queens, destroying or severely damaging thousands of area homes and other structures by ocean and bay storm surges. Hundreds of thousands of residents were left without electric power for periods of time ranging up to several weeks while the damage was being repaired. The slow-moving "Superstorm Sandy" (so-nicknamed because it merged with a nor'easter before it made landfall) caused 90% of Long Island households to lose power and an estimated $18 billion in damages in Nassau and Suffolk counties alone. The storm also had a devastating impact on coastal communities in the Brooklyn and Queens portions of the island, including Coney Island in Brooklyn and the Rockaway Peninsula in Queens, although estimates of monetary damages there are usually calculated as part of the overall losses suffered in New York City as a whole. When allowance is made for inflation, the extent of Sandy's damages is second only to that of those caused by the 1938 Long Island Express. Although a lower central pressure was recorded in Sandy, the National Hurricane Center estimates that the 1938 hurricane had a lower pressure at landfall. Hurricane Sandy and its profound impacts have prompted the discussion of constructing seawalls and other coastal barriers around the shorelines of Long Island and New York City to minimize the risk of destructive consequences from another such event in the future.

Additional islands

Several smaller islands, though geographically distinct, are in proximity to Long Island and are often grouped with it.

Demographics
Long Island is the most populous island and one of the most densely populated regions in the United States. At the 2020 U.S. census, the total population of all four counties of Long Island was 8,063,232, comprising 40% of the population of the State of New York. As of 2020, the proportion of New York City residents (total 8,804,190) living on Long Island had risen to 58.4%, given the 5,141,538 residents living in Brooklyn and Queens.

At the 2020 census, the combined population of Nassau and Suffolk counties was 2,921,694 people, Suffolk County's share being 1,525,920 and Nassau County's 1,395,774. Nassau County had a larger population for decades, but Suffolk County surpassed it in the 1990 census as growth and development continued to spread eastward. As Suffolk County has more than three times the land area of Nassau County, the latter still has a much higher population density, given its proximity to New York City. According to the U.S. Census Bureau's 2008 American Community Survey, Nassau and Suffolk counties had the 10th and 26th highest median household incomes in the nation, respectively.

Whites are the largest racial group in all four counties, and are in the majority in Nassau and Suffolk counties. In 2002, The New York Times cited a study by the non-profit group ERASE Racism, which determined that Nassau and Suffolk counties constitute the most racially segregated suburbs in the United States.

In contrast, Queens is the most ethnically diverse county in the United States and the most diverse urban area in the world.

According to a 2000 report on religion, which asked congregations to respond, Catholics are the largest religious group on Long Island, with non-affiliated in second place. Catholics make up 52% of the population of Nassau and Suffolk, versus 22% for the country as a whole, with Jews at 16% and 7%, respectively, versus 1.7% nationwide. Only a small percentage of Protestants responded, 7% and 8% respectively, for Nassau and Suffolk counties. This is in contrast with 23% for the entire country on the same survey, and 50% on self-identification surveys.

A growing population of nearly half a million Chinese Americans now live on Long Island. Rapidly expanding Chinatowns have developed in Brooklyn (布魯克林) and Queens, with Chinese immigrants also moving into Nassau County, as did earlier European immigrants, such as the Irish and Italians. The busy intersection of Main Street, Kissena Boulevard, and 41st Avenue defines the center of Downtown Flushing and the Flushing Chinatown, known as the "Chinese Times Square" or the "Chinese Manhattan". The segment of Main Street between Kissena Boulevard and Roosevelt Avenue, punctuated by the Long Island Rail Road trestle overpass, represents the cultural heart of the Flushing Chinatown. Housing over 30,000 individuals born in China alone, the largest by this metric outside Asia, Flushing has become home to the largest and one of the fastest-growing Chinatowns in the world as the heart of over 250,000 ethnic Chinese in Queens, representing the largest Chinese population of any U.S. municipality other than New York City in total.  Conversely, the Flushing Chinatown has also become the epicenter of organized prostitution in the United States, importing women from China, Korea, Thailand, and Eastern Europe to sustain the underground North American sex trade. Flushing is undergoing rapid gentrification with investment by Chinese transnational entities,

More recently, a Little India community has emerged in Hicksville, Nassau County, spreading eastward from the more established Little India enclaves in Queens. Rapidly growing Chinatowns have developed in Brooklyn and Queens, as did earlier European immigrants, such as the Irish and Italians. As of 2019, the Asian population in Nassau County had grown by 39% since 2010 to an estimated 145,191 individuals, including approximately 50,000 Indian Americans and 40,000 Chinese Americans, as Nassau County has become the leading suburban destination in the U.S. for Chinese immigrants. Likewise, the Long Island Koreatown originated in Flushing, Queens, and is expanding eastward along Northern Boulevard and into Nassau County.

Long Island is home to two Native American reservations, Poospatuck Reservation, and Shinnecock Reservation, both in Suffolk County. Numerous island place names are Native American in origin.

A 2010 article in The New York Times stated that the expansion of the immigrant workforce on Long Island has not displaced any jobs from other Long Island residents. Half of the immigrants on Long Island hold white-collar positions.

The counties of Nassau and Suffolk have been long renowned for their affluence. Long Island is home to some of the wealthiest communities in the United States, including The Hamptons, on the East End of the South Shore of Suffolk County; the Gold Coast, in the vicinity of the island's North Shore, along Long Island Sound; and increasingly, the western shoreline of Brooklyn, facing Manhattan. In 2016, according to Business Insider, the 11962 zip code encompassing Sagaponack, within Southampton, was listed as the most expensive in the U.S., with a median home sale price of $8.5 million.

Economy

Long Island has played a prominent role in scientific research and in engineering. It is the home of the Brookhaven National Laboratory in nuclear physics and Department of Energy research. Long Island is also home to the Cold Spring Harbor Laboratory, which was directed for 35 years by James D. Watson (who, along with Francis Crick and Rosalind Franklin, discovered the double helix structure of DNA). Companies such as Sperry Corporation, Computer Associates (headquartered in Islandia), Zebra Technologies (now occupying the former headquarters of Symbol Technologies, and a former Grumman plant in Holtsville), have made Long Island a center for the computer industry. Stony Brook University and New York Institute of Technology conduct advanced medical and technological research.

Long Island is home to the East Coast's largest industrial park, the Hauppauge Industrial Park, hosting over 1,300 companies which employ more than 71,000 individuals. Companies in the park and abroad are represented by the Hauppauge Industrial Association. As many as 20% of Long Islanders commute to jobs in Manhattan. The island's eastern end is still partly agricultural. Development of vineyards on the North Fork has spawned a major viticultural industry, replacing potato fields. Pumpkin farms have been added to traditional truck farming. Farms allow fresh fruit picking by Long Islanders for much of the year. Fishing continues to be an important industry, especially at Huntington, Northport, Montauk, and other coastal communities of the East End and South Shore.

From about 1930 to about 1990, Long Island was considered one of the aerospace manufacturing centers of the United States, with companies such as Grumman, Republic, Fairchild, and Curtiss having their headquarters and factories on Long Island. These operations have largely been phased out or significantly diminished.

The largest webmaster company in the United States is based on Long Island, there are over 1500 webmasters on Long Island (Nassau County and Suffolk County). Long Island is on pace to have the most webmasters in the United States, surpassing California by the year 2025. Long Island looks to become an eCommerce and technological hub as local universities and colleges are investing in webmaster jobs and education.

Government and politics

Nassau County and Suffolk County each have their own governments, with a County Executive leading each. Each has a county legislature and countywide-elected officials, including district attorney, county clerk, and county comptroller. The towns in both counties have their own governments as well, with town supervisors and a town council. Nassau County is divided into three towns and two small incorporated cities (Glen Cove and Long Beach). Suffolk County is divided into ten towns.

Brooklyn and Queens, on the other hand, do not have county governments. As boroughs of New York City, both have borough presidents, which have been largely ceremonial offices since the shutdown of the New York City Board of Estimate. The respective Borough Presidents are responsible for appointing individuals to the Brooklyn Community Boards and Queens Community Boards, each of which serves an advisory function on local issues. Brooklyn's sixteen members and Queens' fourteen members represent the first and second largest borough contingents of the New York City Council.

Law enforcement

Queens and Brooklyn are patrolled by the New York City Police Department. Nassau and Suffolk counties are served by the Nassau County Police Department and Suffolk County Police Department, respectively, although several dozen villages and the two cities in Nassau County have their own police departments. The Nassau County Sheriff's Department and Suffolk County Sheriff's Office handle civil procedure, evictions, warrant service and enforcement, prisoner transport and detention, and operation of the county jails. The Suffolk County Sheriff also has a patrol division, and in 2008, had patrol duties along the Long Island Expressway, when the County Executive briefly disbanded the Suffolk County Police Highway Patrol Division. The Suffolk County Sheriff's Office is the oldest law enforcement agency in the State of New York, founded in the year 1683. New York State Police patrol state parks and parkways. The several SUNY colleges and universities are patrolled by the New York State University Police.

Statehood proposals

The secession of Nassau and Suffolk counties on Long Island from New York State was proposed as early as 1896, but talk was revived towards the latter part of the twentieth century. On March 28, 2008, Suffolk County Comptroller Joseph Sawicki proposed a plan that would make Nassau and Suffolk counties on Long Island the 51st state of the United States of America. Sawicki claimed all of Nassau and Suffolk taxpayers' money would remain locally, rather than the funds being dispersed all over the entire state of New York, with these counties sending to Albany over three billion dollars more than they receive. The state of Long Island would have included nearly 3 million people (a larger population than that of fifteen other states). Nassau County executive Ed Mangano came out in support of such a proposal in April 2010 and commissioned a study on it.

Education

Primary and secondary education

Many public and private high schools on Long Island are ranked among the best in the United States. Nassau and Suffolk counties are the home of 125 public school districts containing 656 public schools. It also hosts private schools such as Friends Academy, Chaminade High School, Kellenberg Memorial High School, St. Anthony's High School, and North Shore Hebrew Academy, as well as parochial schools, many of which are operated by the Catholic Diocese of Rockville Centre.

In contrast, all of Brooklyn and Queens are served by the New York City Department of Education, the largest school district in the United States. Three of the nine specialized high schools in New York City are in the two Long Island boroughs, those being Brooklyn Latin School, Brooklyn Technical High School (one of the original three specialized schools), and Queens High School for the Sciences. Like Nassau and Suffolk counties, they are home to private schools such as Poly Prep Country Day School, Packer Collegiate Institute, and Saint Ann's School, and Berkeley Carroll School, and parochial schools operated by the Catholic Diocese of Brooklyn.

Colleges and universities

Long Island is home to a range of higher-education institutions, both public and private. Brooklyn and Queens contain five of eleven senior colleges within CUNY, the public university system of New York City and one of the largest in the country. Among these are the notable institutions of Brooklyn College and Queens College. Brooklyn also contains private colleges such as Pratt Institute and the New York University Polytechnic School of Engineering, an engineering college that merged with New York University in 2014.

Several colleges and universities within the State University of New York system are on Long Island, including Stony Brook University (which noted its health sciences research and medical center), as well as Nassau Community College and Suffolk County Community College that serve their respective counties. Private institutions include Molloy College in Rockville Centre, the New York Institute of Technology, Hofstra University and Adelphi University (both in the Town of Hempstead), as well as Long Island University (with its C.W. Post campus, on a former Gold Coast estate in Brookville, and a satellite campus in downtown Brooklyn). Long Island also contains the Webb Institute, a small naval architecture college in Glen Cove. The island is also home to the United States Merchant Marine Academy, a Federal Service Academy in Kings Point, on the North Shore.

Culture

Music

Music on Long Island (Nassau and Suffolk) is strongly influenced by the proximity to New York City and by the youth culture of the suburbs.
Psychedelic rock was widely popular in the 1960s as flocks of disaffected youth travelled to NYC to participate in protest and the culture of the time. R & B also has a history on Long Island, most notably Huntington-born Mariah Carey, one of the top-selling musicians of all time. In the late 1970s through the 1980s, the influence of radio station WLIR made Long Island one of the first places in the U.S. to hear and embrace European New Wave bands such as Depeche Mode, the Pet Shop Boys, and Culture Club. In the 1990s, hip-hop became popular with rap pioneers Rakim, EPMD, De La Soul, MF Doom, and Public Enemy growing up on Long Island. Long Island was the home of a bustling emo scene in the 2000s, with bands such as Brand New, Taking Back Sunday, Straylight Run, From Autumn to Ashes and As Tall as Lions. More recently, newer acts from Long Island, including Austin Schoeffel, Jon Bellion, and Envy on the Coast, have made a name for themselves.

Rock bands from Long Island include The Rascals, The Ramones (from Queens), Dream Theater, Blue Öyster Cult, Twisted Sister, and guitar virtuosos Donald (Buck Dharma) Roeser, John Petrucci, Steve Vai, and Joe Satriani, and drummer Mike Portnoy. Rock and pop singer Billy Joel grew up in Hicksville, and his music often reflects Long Island and his youth.

Nassau Coliseum and Northwell Health at Jones Beach Theater are venues used by national touring acts as performance spaces for concerts. Northwell Health at Jones Beach Theater is an outdoor amphitheatre at Jones Beach State Park. It is a popular place to view summer concerts that feature new and classic artists. It hosts a large Fourth of July fireworks show every year which fills the stands.

Long Island is also known for its school music programs. Many schools in Suffolk County have distinguished music programs, with high numbers of students who are accepted into the statewide All-State music groups, or even the National All-Eastern Coast music groups. Both the Suffolk County and Nassau County Music Educator's Associations are recognized by The National Association for Music Education (NAfME),
and host numerous events, competitions, and other music-related activities.

Cuisine

Long Island has historically been a center for fishing and seafood. This legacy continues in the Blue Point oyster, a now ubiquitous variety originally harvested on the Great South Bay that was the favorite oyster of Queen Victoria. Clams are also a popular food and clam digging a popular recreational pursuit, with Manhattan clam chowder reputed to have Long Island origins.

Of land-based produce, Long Island duck has a history of national recognition since the 19th century, with four duck farms continuing to produce 2 million ducks a year . Two symbols of Long Island's duck farming heritage are the Long Island Ducks minor-league baseball team and the Big Duck, a 1931 duck-shaped building that is a historic landmark and tourist attraction. In addition to Long Island's duck industry, Riverhead contains one of the largest buffalo farms on the East coast.

Long Island is well known for its production of alcoholic beverages. Eastern Long Island is a significant producer of wine. Vineyards are most heavily concentrated on Long Island's North Fork, which contains 38 wineries. Most of these contain tasting rooms, which are popular attractions for visitors from across the New York metropolitan area. Long Island has also become a producer of diverse craft beers, with 15 microbreweries across Nassau and Suffolk counties . The largest of these is Blue Point Brewing Company, best known for its toasted lager. Long Island is also globally known for its signature cocktail, the Long Island Iced Tea, which was purportedly invented at the popular Babylon, Oak Beach Inn nightclub in the 1970s.

Long Island's eateries are largely a product of the region's local ethnic populations. Asian cuisines, Italian cuisine, Jewish cuisine, and Latin American cuisines were the most popular ethnic cuisines on Long Island as of the second decade of the 2000s. Asian cuisines are predominantly represented by East Asian, South Asian, and Middle Eastern cuisines. Italian cuisine is found in ubiquitous pizzerias throughout the island, with the region hosting an annual competition, the Long Island Pizza Festival & Bake-Off. Jewish cuisine is likewise represented by delicatessens and bagel stores. Latin American cuisines span their geographical origins, from Brazilian rodizios to Mexican taquerias.

Sports

Major league sports
The New York Mets baseball team plays at Citi Field in Flushing Meadows-Corona Park, Queens. Their former stadium, Shea Stadium was also home for the New York Jets football team from 1964 until 1983. The new stadium has an exterior façade and main entry rotunda inspired by Brooklyn's famous Ebbets Field (see below). The New York Mets planned to move their Double-A farm team to Long Island, as part of the ambitious but now-defunct plan for Nassau County called The Lighthouse Project. The Brooklyn Cyclones are a minor league baseball team, affiliated with the New York Mets. The Cyclones play at MCU Park just off the boardwalk on Coney Island in Brooklyn. An artificial turf baseball complex named Baseball Heaven is in Yaphank.

The Barclays Center, a sports arena, business, and residential complex built partly on a platform over the Atlantic Yards at Atlantic Avenue in Brooklyn, is the home of the Brooklyn Nets basketball team. The move from New Jersey in the summer of 2012 marked the return to Long Island for the Nets franchise, which played at Nassau Veterans Memorial Coliseum in Uniondale from 1972 to 1977. The Islanders played at Nassau Coliseum from their 1972 inception through 2015, and then splitting time between Nassau Coliseum and Barclays Center from 2017 to 2021, playing their last full season at the Nassau Coliseum during the 2020-2021 NHL Season. The Islanders moved full-time to UBS Arena at Belmont Park, in Elmont, New York,  in November 2021.

Ebbets Field, which stood in Brooklyn from 1913 until its demolition in 1960, was the home of the Brooklyn Dodgers baseball team, who moved to California after the 1957 Major League Baseball season to become the Los Angeles Dodgers. The Dodgers won several National League pennants in the 1940s and 1950s, losing several times in the World Series—often called Subway Series—to their Bronx rivals, the New York Yankees. The Dodgers won their lone championship in Brooklyn in the 1955 World Series versus the Yankees.

Despite this success during the latter part of the team's stay in Brooklyn, they were a second-division team with an unspectacular winning record for much of their history there – but nonetheless became legendary for the almost-fanatical devotion of the Brooklynites who packed the relatively small ballpark to vigorously root for the team they affectionately called, "Dem Bums". Loss of the Dodgers to California was locally considered a civic tragedy that negatively affected the community far more than the similar moves of other established teams to new cities in the 1950s, including the Dodgers' long-time arch-rival New York Giants, who also left for California after 1957.

Minor league and college sports

The Stony Brook Seawolves represent Stony Brook University, and have had a bevy of athletic accomplishments such as reaching the 2012 College World Series as an underdog after defeating the LSU Tigers in a best-of-3 series.

Long Island is also home to the Long Island Ducks minor league baseball team of the Atlantic League. Their stadium, Bethpage Ballpark, is in Central Islip. The Brooklyn Cyclones minor league baseball team, affiliated with the New York Mets, plays in the High-A classification South Atlantic League. The Cyclones play at MCU Park just off the Coney Island Boardwalk in the New York City borough of Brooklyn. The New York Dragons of the Arena Football League played their home games at Nassau Coliseum. The two main rugby union teams are the Long Island RFC in East Meadow and the Suffolk Bull Moose in Stony Brook.

The New York Sharks is a women's American football team that is a member of the Women's Football Alliance. The New York Sharks home field is at Aviator Sports Complex in Brooklyn.

Long Island's professional soccer club, the New York Cosmos, play in the Division 2 North American Soccer League at James M. Shuart Stadium in Hempstead.

Long Island has historically been a hotbed of lacrosse at the youth and college level, which made way for a Major League Lacrosse team in 2001, the Long Island Lizards. The Lizards play at Mitchel Athletic Complex in Uniondale.

Other sports

Long Island has a wide variety of golf courses found all over the island. Two of the most well-known are the Shinnecock Hills Golf Club and the public Bethpage Black Course that has hosted multiple U.S. Open tournaments as well as several other top level international championships. Queens also hosts one of the four tennis grand slams, the US Open. Every August (September, in Olympic years) the best tennis players in the world travel to Long Island to play the championships held in the USTA National Tennis Center, adjacent to Citi Field in Flushing Meadows Park. The complex also contains the biggest tennis stadium in the world, the Arthur Ashe Stadium.

Long Island also has two horse racing tracks, Aqueduct Racetrack in Ozone Park, Queens and Belmont Park on the Queens/Nassau border in Elmont, home of the Belmont Stakes. The longest dirt thoroughbred racecourse in the world is also at Belmont Park. Another category of sporting events popular in this region involves firematic racing events, involving many local volunteer fire departments.

Notable sportspeople and teams

Long Island is home to numerous famous athletes, including Hall of Famers Jim Brown, Julius Erving, John Mackey, Whitey Ford, Nick Drahos, and Carl Yastrzemski. Others include gold medalists Sue Bird, Sarah Hughes and Derrick Adkins, USWNT World Cup champions Crystal Dunn and Alexandra Long, D'Brickashaw Ferguson, Billy Donovan, Larry Brown, Rick Pitino, John McEnroe, Jumbo Elliott, Mick Foley, Zack Ryder, Matt Serra, Boomer Esiason, Vinny Testaverde, Craig Biggio, Frank Catalanotto, Greg Sacks, Gilles Villemure, Rob Burnett, Steve Park, Frank Viola, Chris Weidman, Don Genalo, Marques Colston, and Speedy Claxton.

Several NHL players were born and/or raised on Long Island, such as Vancouver Canucks Christopher Higgins and Matt Gilroy, Nashville Predators Eric Nystrom, Toronto Maple Leaf Mike Komisarek, Pittsburgh Penguin Rob Scuderi, and New York Ranger Keith Kinkaid. Both Komisarek and Higgins played on the same Suffolk County Hockey League team at an early age, and later played on the Montreal Canadiens together. Nick Drahos was an All Scholastic and All Long Island honoree at Lawrence High School, Nassau Co. in 1936 and 1937, and a two-time Unanimous National College All-American in 1939 and 1940 at Cornell University.

Transportation

Many major forms of transportation serve Long Island, including aviation via John F. Kennedy International Airport, LaGuardia Airport, and Long Island MacArthur Airport, and multiple smaller airports; rail transportation via the Long Island Rail Road and the New York City Subway; bus routes via MTA Regional Bus Operations, Nassau Inter-County Express, and Suffolk County Transit; ferry service via NYC Ferry and multiple smaller ferry companies; and several major highways. There are historic and modern bridges, and recreational and commuter trails, serving various parts of Long Island.

There are eleven road crossings out of Long Island, all but one providing Brooklyn-Manhattan, Queens-Manhattan, and Queens-Bronx connections across the East River, with the Triborough Bridge providing two connections from Queens, one each to Manhattan and the Bronx. The single non-East River crossing is the Verrazzano-Narrows Bridge, connecting Brooklyn to Staten Island across The Narrows. Plans for a Long Island Sound link at locations in Nassau and Suffolk counties (a proposed bridge or tunnel that would link Long Island to the south with Westchester County, New York or Connecticut to the north across Long Island Sound) have been discussed for decades, but there are no plans to construct such a crossing.

Public transportation

The MTA implements mass transportation for the New York metropolitan area including all five boroughs of New York City, the suburban counties of Dutchess, Nassau, Orange, Putnam, Rockland, Suffolk, and Westchester, all of which together are the "Metropolitan Commuter Transportation District (MCTD)".

The MTA considers itself to be the largest regional public transportation provider in the Western Hemisphere. , MTA agencies move about 8.6 million customers per day (translating to 2.65 billion rail and bus customers a year). The MTA's systems carry over 11 million passengers on an average weekday systemwide, and over 850,000 vehicles on its seven toll bridges and two tunnels per weekday.

Rail

The Long Island Rail Road (LIRR) is North America's busiest commuter railroad system, carrying an average of 282,400 passengers each weekday on 728 daily trains. Chartered on April 24, 1834, and operating continuously since, it is also the oldest railroad in the U.S. that still operates under its original charter and name. The Metropolitan Transportation Authority has operated the LIRR as one of its two commuter railroads since 1966, and the LIRR is one of the few railroads worldwide that provides service all the time, year round. In July 2017, a $2 billion plan to add a third railroad track to the LIRR Main Line between the Floral Park and Hicksville stations in Nassau County was approved. Other LIRR projects, such as the Ronkonkoma Branch Double Track Project, are also underway.  Five "readiness projects" across the LIRR system, which will cost a combined $495 million, are also under construction in preparation for expanded peak-hour LIRR service after the completion of East Side Access, which will bring LIRR trains to Grand Central Terminal.

Bus

Nassau Inter-County Express (NICE) provides bus service in Nassau County, while Suffolk County Transit, an agency of the Suffolk County government, provides bus service in Suffolk County. In 2012, NICE replaced the former MTA Long Island Bus in transporting Long Islanders across Nassau County while allowing them to use MTA MetroCards as payment.

Roads

The Long Island Expressway, Northern State Parkway, and Southern State Parkway, all products of the automobile-centered planning of Robert Moses, are the island's primary east–west high-speed controlled-access highways.

Ground transportation

Several hundred transportation companies service the Long Island/New York City area. Winston Airport Shuttle, the oldest of these companies in business since 1973, was the first to introduce door-to-door shared-ride service to and from the major airports, which almost all transportation companies now use.

See also
 List of tallest buildings on Long Island
Geography of New York City
 List of films shot on Long Island
 List of Long Island recreational facilities
 List of Long Islanders, famous residents of Nassau and Suffolk
 List of people from New York City, including famous residents of Brooklyn and Queens
 Long Island (proposed state)
 Timeline of town creation in Downstate New York
 Coastal Connecticut
 Jersey Shore

Notes

References

External links

 

 
Coastal islands of New York (state)
Islands of New York City
Islands of New York (state)
Landforms of Long Island
Moraines of the United States
New York metropolitan area